Moreno Argentin (born 17 December 1960) is an Italian former professional cyclist (from 1981 to 1994) and race director.

Born in San Donà di Piave (Veneto), he won stages in the Tour de France, the Giro d'Italia, and the Tour de Suisse. Known as Il Capo ("The Boss"), he won Liège–Bastogne–Liège four times, the La Flèche Wallonne three times, and the Tour of Flanders and Giro di Lombardia once. He became Italian national champion in 1983 and 1989, and world champion in 1986. He is the founder of the Adriatica Ionica Race which was run for the first time in 2018.

Career achievements

Major results

1977
1st  National Junior Track Championships (Team Pursuit)

1978 
1st  National Junior Track Championships (Team Pursuit)
1st  National Junior Road Championships, Team Time Trial

1979 
1st  National Amateur Track Championships (Team Pursuit)
1st Piccolo Giro di Lombardia
1st Prologue & Stage 4 Giro della Valle d'Aosta
1st Team classification Ster van het Zuiden
2nd Overall Flèche du Sud
4th Trofeo Zssdi - Un. Circ. Sloveni in Italia

1980 
1st  National Amateur Track Championships (Team Pursuit)
1st  National Military Road Championships, Road Race
1st Giro Valli Aretine
1st Coppa Caduti - Puglia di Arezzo
1st Grand Prix Agostano
1st Stage 3 Girobio
1st Prologue Giro della Valle d'Aosta
6th National Amateur Road Championships, Road Race

1981
1st GP Industria e Commercio di Prato
1st Stages 12 & 18 Giro d'Italia
2nd Giro di Lombardia
2nd Arma di Taggia
2nd Rho (Lombardia)
3rd Col San Martino

1982 
1st Trofeo Matteotti
1st GP Industria e Commercio di Prato
1st Giro della Romagna
1st Treviso
1st Stage 9 Giro d'Italia
1st Stage 3 Tour de Suisse
2nd Arma di Taggia
2nd Granze
2nd Roccastrada
3rd Milan–San Remo
3rd Napoli–Pianura
3rd Chignolo Po Criterium

1983
1st  National Road Championships, Road Race
1st Coppa Sabatini
1st Livorno
1st Mussolente
1st San Donà di Piave
1st San Vendemiano
1st Stages 7 & 21 Giro d'Italia
1st Stages 2 & 3 Tirreno–Adriatico
1st Stage 3 Giro di Sardegna
2nd GP Montelup
2nd Six Days of Milan
2nd Cecina
3rd Trofeo Matteotti
3rd Circuito degli Assi - Nanno

1984
1st Overall Settimana Siciliana
1st Stage 2
1st Giro del Veneto
1st Quarrata
1st San Donà di Piave
1st Stage 4 Giro di Puglia
1st Stage 3 Ruota d'Oro
2nd Firenze
2nd Col San Martino
3rd Overall Giro d'Italia
1st Stages 3 & 5

1985
1st  Overall Tour of Denmark
1st Liège–Bastogne–Liège
1st San Vendemiano
1st Scordia
1st Cronostaffetta
1st Stage 1 Tirreno–Adriatico
1st Prologue Tour de Romandie
2nd La Flèche Wallonne
2nd Coppa Bernocchi
2nd Paris–Tours
2nd Giro di Campania
2nd Circuito degli Assi - Nanno
3rd UCI Road World Championships
5th Pernod–Super Prestige
8th FICP Ranking
10th Overall Settimana Siciliana

1986 
1st  UCI Road World Championships
1st Liège–Bastogne–Liège
1st Trofeo Francesco Civettini
1st Curno
2nd Overall Settimana Siciliana
1st Stage 2
2nd GP Industria e Commercio di Prato
3rd Giro della Provincia di Reggio Calabria
4th Eschborn–Frankfurt City Loop
7th Overall Coors Classic
1st Stage 9
8th FICP Ranking

1987 
1st Liège–Bastogne–Liège
1st Giro di Lombardia
1st Bacoli
1st Six Days of Bassano del Grappa
1st San Martino di Castrozza
1st G.P. Banca di Credito Cooperativo dell'Alta Padovana
1st Grazer Altstadt Kriterium
1st Stages 2, 4 & 7 Giro d'Italia
1st Stage 3 Settimana Siciliana
1st Stage 1 Vuelta a Andalucía
1st Stages 2 & 4 Tirreno–Adriatico
1st Stage 16 Coors Classic
2nd UCI Road World Championships
2nd Giro dell'Emilia
3rd Km del Corso Mestre
3rd San Donà di Piave
4th FICP Ranking
6th Trofeo Baracchi
7th Paris–Tours
8th Pernod–Super Prestige
10th La Flèche Wallonne

1988 
1st Giro del Veneto
1st Giro della Provincia di Reggio Calabria
1st Biban de Carbonera
1st Stage 1 Critérium International
2nd La Flèche Wallonne
2nd GP Industria e Commercio di Prato
3rd Nittedal–Oslo

1989 
1st  National Road Championships, Road Race
1st Stage 5 Settimana Siciliana
1st Stage 4 Bicicleta Vasca
3rd Biban de Carbonera

1990 
1st Tour of Flanders
1st La Flèche Wallonne
1st Coppa Sabatini
1st Stage 3 Tour de France
1st Stage 9 Tour de Suisse
4th Milan–San Remo
6th Liège–Bastogne–Liège

1991 
1st Liège–Bastogne–Liège
1st La Flèche Wallonne
1st Sanson
1st Trittico Premondiale
1st Stages 2 (TTT) & 15 Tour de France
2nd San Sebastián Criterium
6th Coppa Bernocchi
10th Giro dell'Appennino
10th Circuito degli Assi - Nanno

1992 
1st Overall Settimana Siciliana
1st Stages 4 & 6
1st Stages 5, 6 & 7 Tirreno–Adriatico
1st Warszawa
2nd Milan–San Remo

1993 
1st Stage 6 Tour Méditerranéen
3rd Giro del Friuli
5th Liège–Bastogne–Liège
6th Overall Giro d'Italia
1st Stages 1a & 13

1994 
1st  Overall Giro del Trentino
1st Stage 2 
1st La Flèche Wallonne
1st Stage 2 Giro d'Italia

Monuments results timeline

DNF = Did not finish— = Did not compete

References

External links 

Official Tour de France results for Moreno Argentin

1960 births
Living people
People from San Donà di Piave
Italian male cyclists
UCI Road World Champions (elite men)
Italian Tour de France stage winners
Italian Giro d'Italia stage winners
Danmark Rundt winners
Tour de Suisse stage winners
Cyclists from the Metropolitan City of Venice